The YMS-418 was a YMS-1 class minesweeper which saw service in World War II. The hull was laid down 16 September 1943 by Henry C. Grebe and Co., Chicago, IL. It was launched 22 February 1944 It was struck from the Navy Register 7 February 1947 and sold 17 December 1947. Its fate is unknown.

References

YMS-1-class minesweepers of the United States Navy
1944 ships